Andrés Gómez won in the final, 6–7, 6–1, 6–1, against Brian Teacher.

Seeds
A champion seed is indicated in bold text while text in italics indicates the round in which that seed was eliminated.

  Jimmy Connors (quarterfinals)
  Gene Mayer (quarterfinals)
  Steve Denton (first round)
  Andrés Gómez (champion)
  Sandy Mayer (semifinals)
  Brian Teacher (final)
  Chris Lewis (quarterfinals)
  John Fitzgerald (quarterfinals)

Draw

External links
 1983 Dallas Open Draw

Singles